Andrieu Contredit d'Arras ( 1200 – 1248) was a trouvère from Arras and active in the Puy d'Arras. "Contredit" is probably a nickname. He wrote mostly grand chants, but also a pastourelle, a lai, and a jeu-parti with Guillaume li Vinier.

Andrieu is probably the  who in 1239, according to French royal documents, joined the Crusade of Theobald I of Navarre as a knight and minstrel. His appearance in royal documents may indicate his service (probably as a minstrel) to Louis IX, and he addressed his song  to Louis.

His song  was addressed to the Puy. One of the most important sources on his life is the register of the Puy. It records his death at Arras in 1248 and the death of his wife in 1225. Besides the register of the Puy are Andrieu's poems themselves, since he wrote twenty and named himself as author in fourteen. He addressed  to a "Marote", probably fellow trouvère Maroie de Diergnau de Lille. Andrieu twice refers to himself as messire (mister), a title reserved for nobility. His blason had once decorated chansonnier known as MS 844 in the Bibliothèque nationale de France, but it has now been lost.

Andrieu's verses show little variation of form. They all begin with the same rhyme scheme (ABAB), all are in regular metre, and all use the same few lengths of line. Andrieu's music is more varied, though it is all in bar form. The melodies are frequently non-repetitive and sometimes motivic.

List of works

, survives without music
, survives without music and incipit
, survives without music and incipit
, his part of a jeu-parti, survives without music

References
Karp, Theodore. "Andrieu Contredit d'Arras." Grove Music Online. Oxford Music Online. Accessed 20 September 2008.

Notes

12th-century births
1248 deaths
Trouvères
Christians of the Crusades
People from Arras
Male classical composers